Nan Ni Ni Aye (born 12 October 1969) is a Burmese politician, currently serving as an Amyotha Hluttaw MP for Kayin State No. 6 constituency, who since 2011. She was a two-time elected MP for Amyotha Hluttaw.

Early life and education 
Nan was born on 12 October 1969 in Hpa-An, Kayin State, Myanmar. She is an ethnic Karen. She graduated with B.Sc (Hons) Zool from Mawlamyine University,  D.C.Sc and M.I.Sc (Computer) from University of Computer Studies, Yangon.

Political career 
She is a member of the Union Solidarity and Development Party. In the 2010 Myanmar general election, she was elected as an Amyotha Hluttaw MP for Kayin State No. 6 parliamentary constituency.

In the 2015 Myanmar general election, she was re-elected as an Amyotha Hluttaw MP for Kayin State No. 6 parliamentary constituency. She also serves as the member of Amyotha Hluttaw's Bill Committee.

References 

Union Solidarity and Development Party politicians
1969 births
Living people
People from Kayin State
Burmese people of Karen descent